This is a list of members of the Northern Ireland Forum.  The Forum was elected in 1996.  Most members were elected on a constituency basis, but the ten highest political parties winning the most votes were each allocated two top-up seats.

110 members were elected.  The Sinn Féin members did not take their seats, while the Social Democratic and Labour Party and UK Unionist Party members later withdrew.

Members are listed by party, and those parties by number of votes won.

Members by party
This is a list of members elected to the Northern Ireland Forum in 1996, sorted by party.

MLAs by constituency
The list is given in alphabetical order by constituency.

See also
Members of the Northern Ireland Assembly
Northern Ireland MPs

References
Northern Ireland Forum for Political Dialogue
Northern Ireland Elections: The 1996 Forum Elections: Regional List of Candidates

 
Northern Ireland, Peace Forum